Zbigniew Antoni Fronczek (born 20 February 1935) is a Polish politician, current Member of Bydgoszcz City Council who represents the 4th district.

On 12 November 2006 he was elected to Bydgoszcz City Council.  He got 592 votes in 4th district, representing the Civic Platform list.  He took office on 27 November 2006.  He is a Vice-Chairperson of Health Policy Committee and a member of Culture and Science Committee.

In 2013, Fronczek was awarded the Officer's Cross of the Polonia Restituta.

See also
 Bydgoszcz City Council

References

External links
 (pl) List of Members of Bydgoszcz City Council V Term (2006-2010)
 Photo of Zbigniew Fronczek

Officers of the Order of Polonia Restituta
Members of Bydgoszcz City Council
1935 births
Living people